The Pirates of Central Park is a 2001 American family adventure short film, adapted from the short story The Pirates of the Round Pond by Lord Dunsany. Directed by Rob Farber, with a screenplay by Daniel Weitzman and produced by Adam Stone, it stars Adam Lamberg, singer and actor Jesse McCartney, Patrick Duffy and Michelle Harris. It was released to cinemas on January 1, 2001 and was an official selection of the Long Island International Film Expo 2001.

Plot
The film is an adventure, following the character Mike Bromback on his quest of self-discovery. The quest starts off with Mike reading about pirates in the library. Simon Baskin (Jesse McCartney) convinces him to take it one step further and become a pirate. Simon will one day meet Mike in Central Park with his friend Chas (or Charles to Mike). They discuss some technical matters and agree to meet the next Saturday. The next time they meet, Chas brings with him a toy ship with torpedoes. They look for the perfect model ship to sink in the pond. They find Captain Fatty and Gogher Boy (Sasha Neulinger), or at least that's what they call them, and decide to sink their ship. Each Saturday Captain Fatty and Gopher Boy bring a new ship and the gang keep sinking them until Captain Fatty and his son find out that it was Simon, Mike, and Chas who have been sinking his ship and thus Captain Fatty and Gopher Boy sink Simon's, Mike's, and Chas's ship.

Cast
Adam Lamberg as Mike Bromback
Jesse McCartney as Simon Baskin
 Joseph Dandry as Captain Fatty
Patrick Duffy as Chaz Farrington
 Michelle Harris as Corrine Bromback
Sasha Neulinger as Bobby Walters

References

External links

Adaptations of works by Lord Dunsany
2001 films
2000s adventure films
2000s English-language films
Central Park